Simone Jean Baptiste Vaillant (1751–1837) was a general of the French Revolutionary Wars and the Napoleonic Wars. Promoted to General of Brigade 20 May 1795. His 7th Battalion of Artillery was awarded Armes of Honor on 19 April 1803.

References

French military personnel of the French Revolutionary Wars
French military personnel of the Napoleonic Wars
1751 births
1837 deaths